Fred Cockerham (3 November 1905 - July 8, 1980) was an American fiddle and banjo player of American folk music.

Cockerham was one of the seven children of Elias and Betty Jane Cockerham in North Carolina. He was one of the most accomplished of all the "Round Peak," North Carolina musicians but is most commonly known as the banjo accompanist to Tommy Jarrell. He played the fiddle in a more modern style than Jarrell, but played the fretless banjo in an old clawhammer style much like that of his old mentor, Charley Lowe.

Discography

References

1905 births
1980 deaths
Old-time musicians
Appalachian old-time fiddlers
American banjoists
People from Surry County, North Carolina
20th-century American musicians